Fred Fangyu Wang (1913 – October 6, 1997) was a Chinese calligrapher, art collector, and a Professor of Chinese at Yale University and Seton Hall University.

Biography
Wang was born in Beijing in 1913, and emigrated to United States of America in 1945. Fred was an alumnus of the Catholic University in Beijing and Columbia University in New York City. In the 1940s he worked with Henry Courtenay Fenn on Chinese grammar at the Institute of Far Eastern Languages at Yale. He taught Chinese language and literature between 1945 and 1965 at Yale. At Seton Hall University, he was the chairman of the department of Asian studies and founder and curator of the Wang Fangyu Collection of Asian Art. He was also part of the team which developed the first Chinese language teaching computer system. Several books and dictionaries on the Chinese language and calligraphy were written by him.

Wang Fangyu was also a calligrapher in his own right, taking up the art later in life.  His work has been shown in numerous venues including:  E & J Frankel Gallery, 1980 (New York, NY),  Rijksmuseum Voor Volkenkunde, 1981 (Leiden, Netherlands),  Asia Society, 1984, (New York, NY), University of Iowa, 1991, National Museum of Far Eastern Antiquities, 1994 (Stockholm, Sweden) The Newark Museum, 2000 (Newark, New Jersey) Duke University Art Museum, 2002 (Durham, North Carolina).  His work is in the Seton Hall University Permanent Collection.

Wang was also an avid collector of Bada Shanren paintings and calligraphies. During his lifetime, he and his wife Sum Wai (沈慧) amassed the largest private collection of Bada Shanren's art. The Freer Gallery of Art later bought the entire collection from the couple's estate.

When he died, he left behind relatives in mainland China, Taiwan, and the USA.

References

Works

External links 
 Institute of Far Eastern Languages, Yale University
Walsh Gallery Collections - includes objects from the Wang Fangyu Collection of Asian Art
Seton Hall University Department of Archives and Special Collections - Wang Fangyu archival materials on deposit here

1913 births
1997 deaths
Republic of China calligraphers
American calligraphers
Artists from Beijing
Yale University faculty
Seton Hall University faculty
Writers from Beijing
20th-century linguists
Seton Hall University
Chinese-American culture
Linguists from China
American art collectors